The 2014–15 Men's FIH Hockey World League Round 2 was held from January to March 2015. A total of 24 teams competed in 3 events in this round of the tournament playing for 9 berths in the Semifinals, to be played in June and July 2015.

Qualification
8 teams ranked between 12th and 19th in the FIH World Rankings current at the time of seeking entries for the competition qualified automatically in addition to 14 teams qualified from Round 1 and two nations that did not meet ranking criteria and were exempt from Round 1 to host a Round 2 tournament. Fiji and Sri Lanka withdrew from participating and Oman and Ukraine took their place. The following 24 teams, shown with final pre-tournament rankings, competed in this round of the tournament.

Singapore
Singapore, Singapore, 17–25 January 2015.

All times are Singapore Time (UTC+08:00)

First round

Pool A

Pool B

Second round
{{8TeamBracket-Consols
| RD3-team1=| RD3-score1=10
| RD3-team2=| RD3-score2=1

| RD3-team3=| RD3-score3=5
| RD3-team4=| RD3-score4=0

| RD3-team5= (p.s.o.)| RD3-score5=3 (2)
| RD3-team6=| RD3-score6=3 (0)

| RD3-team7=| RD3-score7=8
| RD3-team8=| RD3-score8=0

| RD4-team1= (p.s.o.)| RD4-score1=1 (3)| RD4-team2=| RD4-score2=1 (2)

| RD4-team3=| RD4-score3=1
| RD4-team4=| RD4-score4=7| RD2-team1=| RD2-score1=2
| RD2-team2=| RD2-score2=4| RD2-team3=| RD2-score3=3| RD2-team4=| RD2-score4=0

| RD5-team1=| RD5-score1=8| RD5-team2=| RD5-score2=0

| RD5b-team1=| RD5b-score1=4| RD5b-team2=| RD5b-score2=0

| RD1-team1=| RD1-score1=3| RD1-team2=| RD1-score2=1

| RD1b-team1=| RD1b-score1=3
| RD1b-team2=| RD1b-score2=4'| RD3=
| dateQF = 22 January 2015
| semifinals=
| dateSF = 24 January 2015
| consolation=
| date5-8 = 23 January 2015
| final=
| date1 = 25 January 2015
| third=
| date3 = 25 January 2015
| fifth=
| date5 = 25 January 2015
| seventh=
| date7 = 25 January 2015
}}

Quarter-finals

Fifth to eighth place classification

Crossover

Seventh and eighth place

Fifth and sixth place

First to fourth place classification

Semifinals

Third and fourth place

Final

Awards
Player of the Tournament: 
Top Scorer:  (12 goals)
Young Player of the Tournament: 
Goalkeeper of the Tournament: 

San Diego
San Diego, United States, 28 February–8 March 2015.All times are Pacific Standard Time (UTC−08:00) except the ones on 8 March 2015 which are Pacific Daylight Time (UTC−07:00)First round

Pool A

Pool B

Second round

Quarterfinals

Fifth to eighth place classification

Crossover

Seventh and eighth place

Fifth and sixth place

First to fourth place classification

Semifinals

Third and fourth place

Final

Awards
Player of the Tournament:  Shane O'Donoghue
Top Scorer:  (7 goals)
Young Player of the Tournament: 
Goalkeeper of the Tournament:  David Harte

Cape Town
Cape Town, South Africa, 7–15 March 2015.All times are South African Standard Time (UTC+02:00)''

First round

Pool A

Pool B

Second round

Quarterfinals

Fifth to eighth place classification

Crossover

Seventh and eighth place

Fifth and sixth place

First to fourth place classification

Semifinals

Third and fourth place

Final

Awards
Player of the Tournament: 
Top Scorer:  (6 goals)
Young Player of the Tournament: 
Goalkeeper of the Tournament:

References

External links
Official website (Singapore)
Official website (San Diego)
Official website (Cape Town)

Round 2
International field hockey competitions hosted by Singapore
International field hockey competitions hosted by the United States
International field hockey competitions hosted by South Africa